Chamika Buddhadasa MP is a Member of Parliament representing the Badulla District. He is the son of A. M. Buddhadasa (Minister of Health -  Uva Provincial Council). In May 2010 he was appointed as the responsible MP for the field of Highways.

Early life
He was born and raised in Welimada and Uva-Paranagama area. His father was a successful businessman and politician. He received his primary and secondary education at the St Thomas college Gurutalawa.

Political career
In 2009 he was appointed as the chief SLFP of the Uva-Paranagama Electorate.

References

Members of the 14th Parliament of Sri Lanka
Living people
Year of birth missing (living people)